Nockebybron (The Nockeby Bridge) is a 450 meter long swing bridge in Lake Mälaren between Kärsön in the Ekerö County and Nockeby in Bromma, Stockholm County. The current bridge was opened in 1973.

Images

External links 

Bridges in Stockholm
Swing bridges
1973 establishments in Sweden